Heterogeneous nuclear ribonucleoprotein U is a protein that in humans is encoded by the HNRNPU gene.

Function 

This gene belongs to the subfamily of ubiquitously expressed heterogeneous nuclear ribonucleoproteins (hnRNPs). The hnRNPs are RNA binding proteins that form complexes with heterogeneous nuclear RNA (hnRNA). These proteins are associated with pre-mRNAs in the nucleus and appear to influence pre-mRNA processing and other aspects of mRNA metabolism and transport. While all of the hnRNPs are present in the nucleus, some seem to shuttle between the nucleus and the cytoplasm. The hnRNP proteins have distinct nucleic acid binding properties. The protein encoded by this gene contains a RNA binding domain and scaffold-associated region (SAR)-specific bipartite DNA-binding domain. This protein is also thought to be involved in the packaging of hnRNA into large ribonucleoprotein complexes. During apoptosis, this protein is cleaved in a caspase-dependent way. Cleavage occurs at the SALD site, resulting in a loss of DNA-binding activity and a concomitant detachment of this protein from nuclear structural sites. But this cleavage does not affect the function of the encoded protein in RNA metabolism. At least two alternatively spliced transcript variants have been identified for this gene.

Interactions 

HNRPU has been shown to interact with:
 EP300, 
 GTF2F1,
 Glucocorticoid receptor,  and
 NDN.

References

Further reading 

 
 
 
 
 
 
 
 
 
 
 
 
 
 
 
 
 
 

Ribonucleoproteins